Michael Haaß (born 12 December 1983 in Essen) is a former German handball player, currently he is a head coach of TuS Nettelstedt-Lübbecke in Handball-Bundesliga.

He competed at the World Cup 2007, 2008 Summer Olympics in Beijing, where the German team placed 9th, EURO 2010, World Cup 2011 and EURO 2012 Haaß won the EHF Cup 2005 with TUSEM Essen and 2011 with Frisch Auf Göppingen and the Handball World Cup with the German national team. He also stood in the German Cup final with Rhein-Neckar Löwen in 2007.

References

1983 births
Living people
Sportspeople from Essen
German male handball players
Olympic handball players of Germany
Handball players at the 2008 Summer Olympics